Bannoye (Ak-Sas) is a rural locality (a selo) in Ust-Koksinsky District, the Altai Republic, Russia. The population was 332 as of 2016. There are 8 streets.

Geography 
Bannoye is located 81 km northwest of Ust-Koksa (the district's administrative centre) by road. Abay is the nearest rural locality.

References 

Rural localities in Ust-Koksinsky District